Events in the year 1881 in Iceland.

Incumbents 

 Monarch: Christian IX
 Minister for Iceland: Johannes Nellemann

Events 

 The Alþingishúsið (The Parliament House) is constructed.

Births 

 13 January – Sigvaldi Kaldalóns, composer
 27 February – Sveinn Björnsson, first President of Iceland.
 6 August – Hulda, poet
 Jón Stefánsson, landscape artist

References 

 
1880s in Iceland
Years of the 19th century in Iceland
Iceland
Iceland